The Naradhan railway line is a railway line in south-western New South Wales, Australia. It branches from Ungarie on the Lake Cargelligo line and heads in a westerly direction, passing through Youngareen and Kikoira, to the small town of Naradhan. The line opened on 11 February 1929 to open up the region for agriculture, and is currently used for seasonal grain haulage. The line saw passenger services until 1974.

A 1929 proposal to extend the line to Monia Gap was never actioned.

Passenger Services
From the opening of the railway a tri-weekly passenger service operated in each direction. The service was a mixed passenger and goods train leaving Ungarie on Mondays, Wednesdays and Fridays at 1:20pm, and leaving the terminus, Naradhan, on Tuesdays, Thursdays, and Saturdays at 9:06am. Naradhan branch line trains connected at Ungarie with the Lake Cargelligo to West Wyalong services, and those trains connected at West Wyalong with the mail trains to Sydney. Passenger services ceased in 1975. Today it is served by seasonal grain trains.

Stations

References

External links

Railway lines opened in 1929
Regional railway lines in New South Wales
Standard gauge railways in Australia
1929 establishments in Australia